Bharkhani is a village and corresponding community development block in Hardoi district of Uttar Pradesh, India. It has several schools, one clinic, and a public library, and there is a regular market as well as a weekly haat. A fair called Banshi Baba is held here on Chaitra Badi 30. The main staple crops here are wheat and rice. As of 2011, the population of Bharkhani is 5,681, in 888 households.

Demographic history 
The 1961 census recorded Bharkhani as comprising 6 hamlets, with a combined population of 2,383 (1,263 male and 1,120 female), in 498 households and 294 physical houses. The area of the village was given as 2,682 acres.

The 1981 census recorded Bharkhani as having a population of 3,366, in 656 households, and covering an area of 1,065.98 hectares.

Villages 
Bharkhani CD block has the following 183 villages:

References 

Villages in Hardoi district